John Edward McCarthy (22 February 1917 – 18 February 1998) was an Australian cricketer. He played in two first-class matches for Queensland between 1935 and 1941.

References

External links
 

1917 births
1998 deaths
Australian cricketers
Queensland cricketers
People from Maryborough, Queensland
Cricketers from Queensland